Gabriele Maria Finaldi (born November 1965) is a British art historian and curator. Since August 2015, he has been director of the National Gallery in London, England.

Early life and education
Finaldi was born in Barnet and raised in Catford in south London, the son of a Neapolitan father and a half-Polish-half-English mother.
He was educated at Dulwich College before studying art history at The Courtauld Institute of Art where he completed his doctorate in 1995 on the 17th-century Spanish Baroque painter Jusepe de Ribera.

Career
Finaldi has curated exhibitions in the UK, Spain, Italy and Belgium and has written catalogues and scholarly articles on Velázquez and Zurbarán, on Italian Baroque painting, on religious iconography, and on Picasso.

Finaldi was a curator at the National Gallery between 1992 and 2002. He was responsible for the later Italian paintings in the collection (Caravaggio to Canaletto) and the Spanish collection (Bermejo to Goya). In 2002 he was appointed Deputy Director for Collections and Research at the Museo Nacional del Prado in Madrid, Spain. At the Prado he oversaw the project to build a new extension in 2007, the creation of the Research Centre, and curated major exhibitions on Ribera (in 2011) and Bartolomé Esteban Murillo (in 2012).

In August 2015, Finaldi returned to the National Gallery having been appointed its director.

References

1965 births
Living people
English people of Italian descent
People from the London Borough of Barnet
English curators
English art historians
Alumni of the Courtauld Institute of Art
Directors of the National Gallery, London